The 2018 Mikhail Voronin Cup took place on December 12–13 in Moscow, Russia.

Medal winners

Senior

Junior

References

Voronin Cup
2018 in gymnastics
2018 in Russian sport
Sports competitions in Moscow
December 2018 sports events in Russia
2018 in Moscow